Levi Zane Miller (born 30 September 2002) is an Australian actor and model. He is known for playing Peter Pan in Pan (2015), Luke in Better Watch Out (2016), and Calvin in A Wrinkle in Time (2018).

Early life
Miller was born in Brisbane, Queensland, Australia. At the age of 5 or 6 he entered and won a drama competition with a Peter Pan monologue. He appeared in several Australian television commercials.

Career
Miller appeared in the film A Heartbeat Away (2012) and in short films such as Akiva (2010) and Great Adventures (2012). He was selected by the film's director Joe Wright for the role of Peter Pan in Pan. He appeared in Red Dog: True Blue where he played Mick.

In 2015, he was named ambassador for Polo, the Ralph Lauren kids' fall campaign.

In 2016, Miller starred as Luke in the psychological horror Christmas-themed film Better Watch Out where the young Australian actor's performance was highly regarded by film critics. He played Charlie Bucktin in the film adaptation of Australian novel Jasper Jones.

In 2018, he played Calvin O'Keefe in the American fantasy adventure A Wrinkle in Time. The next year, he played Leo in the film American Exit (2019). Miller also played Bejamin Lane in the sports drama film Streamline (2021). In 2022, Miller was cast in the superhero film Kraven the Hunter.

Filmography

Film

Television

Awards and nominations

References

External links

 
 
 

2002 births
Living people
21st-century Australian male actors
Australian male child actors
Australian male film actors
Australian male television actors
People from Brisbane